Ibn al-Qasim is a component of Arabic masculine names. Notable people whose full name includes "Ibn al-Qasim" or "Ibn al-Kasim" include:

Ibn al-Qasim ('Abd ar-Rahman ibn al-Qasim al-'Utaqi), prominent early jurist in the Maliki school from Egypt
Muhammad ibn al-Qasim (disambiguation)
Muhammad ibn al-Qasim
Muhammad ibn al-Qasim (vizier)
Muhammad ibn al-Qasim al-Badisi
Al-Hajjam al-Hasan ibn Muhammad ibn al-Qasim
Al-Husayn ibn al-Qasim
Yahya ibn al-Qasim

Arabic masculine given names